North Florida Shipyards is a ship repair and conversion company, Founded in 1978. The company is situated in Jacksonville, Florida and includes two facilities – one located in the Commodores Point area of Jacksonville the other on Mayport Naval Station. The main focus of the company is ship repair and conversion.  The shipyard works on tankers and cargo ships, passenger vessels, tugs, barges, offshore supply vessels and offshore yachts. The company has 3600 feet  of bulk-headed wharf,  210,000 sq. ft. of warehouse and shops, and resides on approximately 25 acres of property.

References

Shipbuilding companies of Florida
Shipyards of the United States
Industrial buildings and structures in Florida